Kernel is a technology company that creates brain-machine interfaces. It is a privately held company headquartered in Los Angeles, California. The company was founded in 2016 by Bryan Johnson.

History 
Johnson founded Kernel in 2016 with a $54 million investment and began researching neuroprosthetics, devices implanted into the brain that mimic, substitute, or assist brain functions.

In May 2020, Kernel introduced two brain-activity monitoring devices, Flux and Flow. The Flow device can both see and record brain activity.

Kernel also introduced "Sound ID," a software that can tell what speech or song a person is listening to just from brain data. The company was featured in the 2020 documentary, I Am Human, about brain-machine interfaces. Kernel raised $53 million in 2020.

Kernel Flow  
Kernel Flow is a wearable time-domain functional near-infrared spectroscopy (TD-fNIRS) system. fNIRs uses infrared light to measure changes in the oxygenation of blood, which is a proxy for neural activity. Kernel Flow can achieve a 200 Hz sampling rate. The spatial resolution of f-NIRS is strongly limited by scattering, with most existing f-NIRS systems having resolutions > 2 cm.

Operations 
Kernel plans to read and write the underlying functions of the brain.

As of 2019, the company is researching neurological diseases and dysfunctions such as Alzheimer's and Parkinson's diseases, depression and anxiety. Kernel is one of several companies researching links between the human brain and computer interfaces, including Neuralink and Facebook. Kernel also offers neuroscience as a service to scientists and businesses, conducting subject testing at their office.

References

External links 
 Official website

Brain–computer interfacing
2016 establishments in California
American companies established in 2016